Kigumba is a town in Kiryandongo District, northwestern Uganda. It is one of the urban centers in the district. The other urban centres  in Kiryandongo District include: (a)  Karuma b) Kiryandongo (c) Bweyale and (d) Masindi Port.

Location
The coordinates of the town are:01 48 54N, 32 00 36E (Latitude:1.8150; Longitude:32.0100).

Overview
Kigumba lies at the location where the highway from Kampala to Gulu through Kibangya and Rwekunye joins the highway from Masindi to Gulu. It is a busy transit point. Established in the 1950s, the town is home to about 100 Ugandan and Kenyan ethnicities. In 2009, the town attained Municipal council status. The municipality consists of the following neighborhoods: (a) Old Kigumba (b) Naguru (c) Kigaragara (d) Kitwanga, the CBD  (e) Kihura I (f) Kihura II and (g) Kabukye. Most of the developments are in the Kitwanga neighborhood. Here one can find the town council offices, financial institutions, factories, restaurants and most bars. The booming trade,  has also attracted Indian, Chinese and South Sudanese traders, who have established businesses, including food processing plants.

Organizational structure

The political head of the town is the LC III Chairperson who is elected to a five-year term by universal adult suffrage across the six wards. The supreme policy-making organ is the Town Council, composed of 12 elected councilors. The technical staff of the municipality is headed by the town clerk, Mr. Akugizibwe Gabriel under whom there are several municipal departments.

As of August 2014, the LC III chairman of the Town Council is Mr. Karubanga Jacob Ateenyi and the town clerk is Mr. Akugizibwe Gabriel

Population
The census in 2002 enumerated the population at 8,439 people. In 2014, the national population census and household survey put the population of Kigumba at 18,625. In July 2020, the Uganda Bureau of Statistics estimated the midyear population of the town at 22,000. The population agency calculated that the population of the town had increased at an average annual rate of 2.98 percent, between 2014 and 2020.

Economic activities
Many women in the town engage in such activities as farming, road-side groceries, market vending, restaurants, hair care, and health care clinics. Men are mainly engaged in wholesale and retail merchandising, taxi driving and boda boda (motorcycle and bicycle) for-hire transportation. Increasingly, residents of Kigumba Town are employed in salaried and non-salaried positions at the district headquarters in Bweyale.

Points of interest
Located within the town itself is Kigumba Petroleum Institute (KPI), a tertiary institution of education belonging to the Ugandan government. The Institute occupies premises that formerly housed, Uganda Cooperative College, which has now relocated to the Eastern Ugandan town of Tororo. KPI has now been elevated to University status. Kigumba Central Market is the largest fresh-food market in town. Stanbic Bank (Uganda) Limited, the largest commercial bank in Uganda, by assets and branches, maintains a branch in Kigumba.

See also
 Kigumba Petroleum Institute
 Kiryandongo District
 Bunyoro sub-region

References

External links
 Kigumba Satellite Map at Maplandia.com
 Uganda Cooperative College Kigumba

Populated places in Uganda
Cities in the Great Rift Valley
Kiryandongo District